General Wilson may refer to:

United Kingdom
Alexander Wilson (British Army officer) (1858–1937), British Army major general
Bevil Wilson (1885–1975), British Army major general
Charles William Wilson (1836–1905), British Army major general
Dare Wilson (1919–2014), British Army major general
David Wilson (Royal Marines officer) (born 1949), Royal Marines major general
Francis Adrian Wilson (1874–1954), British Army major general
Gordon Wilson (British Army officer) (1887–1971), British Army lieutenant general
Henry Fuller Maitland Wilson (1859–1941), British Army lieutenant general
Henry Maitland Wilson (1881–1964), British Army general
Sir Henry Wilson, 1st Baronet (1864–1922), British Army general
James Wilson (British Army officer) (1921–2004), British Army lieutenant general
John Wilson (British Army officer, died 1856) (1780–1856), British Army general
Robert Wilson (British Army officer, born 1777) (1777–1849), British Army general 
Roger Wilson (Indian Army officer) (1882–1966), British Indian Army general
Samuel Wilson (East India Company officer) (fl. 1780s–1820s), British East India Company major general
Samuel Herbert Wilson (1873–1950), British Army brigadier general
Thomas Needham Furnival Wilson (1896−1961), British Army major general
Thomas Spencer Wilson (1727–1798), British Army general
William Deane Wilson (1843–1921), British Army surgeon-general
Wiltshire Wilson (1762–1842), British Army lieutenant general

United States
Arthur R. Wilson (1894–1956), U.S. Army major general
B. Edwin Wilson (fl. 1980s–2010s), U.S. Air Force major general
Claudius C. Wilson (1831–1863), Confederate States Army brigadier general
Cornell A. Wilson Jr. (fl. 1970s–2000s), U.S. Marine Corps major general
David Wilson (U.S. Army general) (fl. 1990s–2020s), U.S. Army major general
Donald Wilson (general) (1892–1978), U.S. Army Air Forces major general
Frances C. Wilson (fl. 1970s–2000s), U.S. Marine Corps lieutenant general
George Wilson (American football halfback) (1905–1990), U.S. Marine Corps brigadier general
James H. Wilson (1837–1925), Union Army major general
John Moulder Wilson (1837–1919), Union Army brigadier general
Johnnie E. Wilson (born 1944), U.S. Army four-star general
Lester S. Willson (1839–1919), Union Army brevet brigadier general 
Louis H. Wilson Jr. (1920–2005), U.S. Marine Corps four-star general
Louis L. Wilson Jr. (1919–2010), U.S. Air Force general
Robert Wilson (Missouri politician) (1803–1870), Missouri Militia brigadier general
Roscoe Charles Wilson (1905–1986), U.S. Air Force lieutenant general
Samuel V. Wilson (1923–2017), U.S. Army lieutenant general
Stephen W. Wilson (born c. 1959/1960), U.S. Air Force four-star general
Walter K. Wilson Jr. (1906–1985), U.S. Army lieutenant general
Winston P. Wilson (1911–1996), U.S. Air Force major general

Other
Arthur Gillespie Wilson (1900–1982), Australian Army major general
Lachlan Chisholm Wilson (1871–1947), Australian Army brigadier general
Richard Wilson (general) (born 1955), Australian Army major general

See also
Attorney General Wilson (disambiguation)